The Gainesville Commercial Historic District in Gainesville, Georgia is an  historic district which is roughly bounded by Broad St., Maple St., Academy St. and Green St.   It was listed on the National Register of Historic Places in 2003.

It included 50 contributing buildings, 18 non-contributing buildings, one contributing structure, one contributing site, and a contributing object.

It includes:
Imperial Pharmacy (1871),
Hosch Building (c.1901),
Logan Building (1929), separately listed on the National Register
Dixie Hunt Hotel (1938), separately listed on the National Register
Federal Building and Courthouse, separately listed on the National Register
Jackson Building, separately listed on the National Register.

References

Historic districts in Georgia (U.S. state)
National Register of Historic Places in Hall County, Georgia
Romanesque Revival architecture in Georgia (U.S. state)
Renaissance Revival architecture in Georgia (U.S. state)
Buildings and structures completed in 1820